Chris Buck Band is a Canadian country music group from Vancouver, British Columbia composed of Chris Buck, and Taylor Allum. Buck formed the band when he lost his best friend to cancer at age 13. Their first single, "Caribbean Dream", was released in 2013. It was included on their debut album, Buck Wild, released in June 2014. Chris Buck Band won the 2014 British Columbia Country Music Association Award for Country Club Act of the Year. At the 2015 BCCMA Awards, they won Country Club Act of the Year and Group/Duo of the Year.

Their second single, "Leave Your Light On", was released in 2015. It peaked at number 44 on the Billboard Canada Country chart. They signed to Bailey Way Entertainment for the release of their next single, "Giddy Up". It debuted on the Canada Country chart in February 2016.

Discography

Studio albums

Singles

Music videos

References

External links

Canadian country music groups
Musical groups from Vancouver
Musical quintets